Hüseyin Rahmi Gürpınar Museum is a historic house museum dedicated to the writer Hüseyin Rahmi Gürpınar in İstanbul, Turkey.

Hüseyin Rahmi Gürpınar (1864-1944) was a famous writer specialized in daily life of İstanbul, mostly in a humorous way. During the 1912-1944 period, he lived on Heybeliada. His house is situated on top of a hill overlooking the Marmara Sea. After his death, the house was handed over to various museum authorities with the intention of establishing a historic house museum. For over half a century, it was neglected. Finally, the building was converted into a museum by the Ministry of Culture and Tourism with the support of Adalar Municipality. It was opened to visits in 2000.

In 2013, İstanbul Metropolitan Municipality tried to convert the museum into a training center. Upon public protests, its status remained unchanged. Currently, the museum is under restoration.

References

Museums in Istanbul
Historic house museums in Turkey
Museums established in 2000
2000 establishments in Turkey
Adalar